, abbreviated as Meiji (明治) or Meidai (明大), is a private research university located in Chiyoda City, the heart of Tokyo, Japan. Established in 1881 as Meiji Law School (明治法律学校, Meiji Hōritsu Gakkō) by three Meiji-era lawyers, Kishimoto Tatsuo, Miyagi Kōzō, and Yashiro Misao, Meiji University is one of the oldest and most prestigious institutions of higher learning in Japan.

The university has a total of approximately 33,000 students on all four campuses around the Greater Tokyo Area: Surugadai, Izumi, Ikuta, and Nakano. Meiji is organized into 10 undergraduate, 12 graduate, 4 professional graduate schools; and operates 15 world-class research centers and a museum. It began its first partner agreement in 1986 with York University in Canada, and currently partners with 363 universities and institutions in 56 countries. Some of the university's partners include: Stanford University, Columbia University, the University of Oxford, the University of Cambridge, the National University of Singapore and the University of Hong Kong.

Meiji University is one of Japan's leading private universities. It has highly selective admissions, with an acceptance rate averaging around 15%. It is known to be Japan's most popular university with applications exceeding 100,000 annually, and in 2020, was named the top institution for attractive courses and subjects of study. Meiji is a part of the Top Global University Project of Japan's Ministry of Education, Culture, Sports, Science and Technology. The university is a sporting powerhouse with memberships in top-tier intercollegiate athletic associations in Japan, consistently winning national competitions. As of 2021, 270 Meiji alumni have competed in the olympics and garnered 40 medals, 14 gold, 13 silver and 13 bronze.

From its founding, it has sent out 570,000 graduates around the world, with alumni in diverse fields such as world politics, business, culture, entertainment, sports, and mass media. Meiji University's alumni have included: Japan's first female lawyer, 2 Japanese prime ministers, 48 national politicians, 380 professional athletes, 115 company presidents, and 264 artists.

Organization

Undergraduate schools

School of Law
Department of Law
School of Commerce
Department of Commerce
School of Political Science and Economics
Department of Political Science
Department of Economics
Department of Regional Administration
School of Arts and Letters
Department of Literature
Department of History and Geography
Department of Social Psychology
School of Science and Technology
Department of Electrical Engineering
Department of Electronics and Communication Engineering
Department of Mechanical Engineering
Department of Precision Engineering
Department of Architecture
Department of Industrial Chemistry
Department of Information Science
Department of Mathematics
Department of Physics
School of Agriculture
Department of Agriculture
Department of Agricultural Economics
Department of Agricultural Chemistry
Department of Life Sciences
School of Business Administration
Department of Business Administration
Department of Accounting
Department of Public Management
School of Information and Communication
Department of Information and Communication
School of Global Japanese Studies
Department of Global Japanese Studies

Graduate schools
Graduate School of Law
Graduate School of Commerce
Graduate School of Political Science and Economics
Graduate School of Business Administration
Graduate School of Arts and Letters
Graduate School of Science and Technology
Graduate School of Agriculture
Graduate School of Governance Studies
Graduate School of Global Business
Graduate School of Professional Accountancy
Graduate School of Advanced Mathematical Sciences

Law school
Department of Law

Campus life 
Meiji University's baseball team belongs to the Tokyo Big6 Baseball League. Every year, rugby union and baseball matches Meisōsen against Waseda University attract support among its students. It also has a successful judo team.

The university announced on February 26, 2009, that it would open a museum dedicated to anime and manga. It will include international research centers hosting Japanese and international scholars as well as a large quality of artifacts on the subject.

Academic rankings

Meiji University is one of the leading universities in Japan.

General rankings
The university has been ranked 19th and 26th in 2009 and 2010 respectively in the ranking "Truly Strong Universities" (本当に強い大学) by Toyo Keizai.

Research performance
The Nikkei Shimbun on 16 February 2004 surveyed about the research standards in engineering studies based on Thomson Reuters, Grants in Aid for Scientific Research and questionnaires to heads of 93 leading Japanese Research Centers, and Meiji was placed 37th in this ranking.

Meiji has filed the 62nd highest number of patents in the nation as its research outcomes.

Graduate school rankings
Meiji Law School is considered one of the top Japanese law schools, as Meiji's number of successful candidates for Japanese bar examination has been 14th and 20th in 2009 and 2010 respectively. It is one of the strongest department in this university as the cumulative number of people qualified as lawyer and prosecutor has been historically sixth after WW2.

Eduniversal ranked Meiji as fourth in the rankings of "Excellent Business Schools nationally strong and/or with continental links" in Japan.

Meiji University is one of the top 10 private universities in Japan.

Alumni rankings
Graduates from Meiji enjoy good success in the Japanese industries.

According to the Weekly Economist's 2010 rankings, graduates from Meiji University have the 35th best employment rate in 400 major companies

The university is also ranked sixth in Japan for the number of alumni holding the position of executive in the listed companies of Japan, and this number per student (probability of becoming an executive) is 25th.

Meiji graduates have been ranked fifth in Japan in the number of successful national CPA exam applicants. Its graduates have been also ranked ninth in Japan in the number of successful Architect Registration exam applicants.

Furthermore, the number of Members of Parliament who graduated Meiji is sixth in Japan.

Popularity and selectivity
Meiji is a popular university in Japan. The number of applicants per place was 24.9 (113,905/4,582) in the 2011 undergraduate admissions, this number of applicants (113,905) was largest in 2011. Its entrance difficulty is also very selective.

Meiji university is regarded as comparable with the Tokyo-area private universities Aoyama Gakuin, Rikkyo, Chuo, and Hosei
collectively called "MARCH".

It has an entrance examination difficulty level that is in the top 10 for a private university in Japan.

Alumni

Politics

World leaders
The 66th Japanese Prime Minister Takeo Miki (1974–1976)
The 81st Japanese Prime Minister Tomiichi Murayama (1994–1996)
The first Chinese Premier Zhou Enlai (1949–1976)

Other politicians
Dr.Gibril Ibrahim (Minister of Finance and Economic Planning) in the republic of Sudan. 
Xie Jishi (Manchu Empire Foreign Minister)
Hasegawa Nyozekan
Yōsuke Matsuoka (Minister for Foreign Affairs)
Ichio Asukata (chairman of the Japan Socialist Party)
Takashi Sasagawa (Minister)
Ken Harada (Minister of Economic Planning)
Masayuki Fujio (Minister of Education)
Hiromichi Watanabe
Yoshitaka Sakurada
Fumiaki Matsumoto
Ritsuo Hosokawa (Minister of Health, Labour and Welfare)
Yoshitaka Shindo (Minister of Internal Affairs and Communications)
Satoshi Takayama
Shigeo Kitamura
Yoshio Urushibara
Koichi Tani
Masaji Matsuyama
Masaaki Akaike
Naoki Inose (Governor of Tokyo, journalist)
Ben Nighthorse Campbell, US Senator

Others

Yū Aku (lyricist, poet, and novelist）
Seiya Ando (basketball player)
Hideki Arai (manga artist)
Morio Agata (singer)
Yuta Fujihara (professional soccer player)
Tatsuji Fuse (Korean independence movement custodian)
Hideo Gosha (film director)
Koji Hashimoto (professional soccer player)
Masaaki Hatsumi (martial artist, founder of Bujinkan)
Tiger Hattori (professional wrestling referee, New Japan Pro-Wrestling)
Syu Hiraide (novelist, lawyer)
Takafumi Hori (soccer manager)
Senichi Hoshino (baseball player, manager)
Kei Inoo (member of Hey! Say! JUMP, idol, actor, singer)
Mao Inoue (actress)
Sogo Ishii
Kensuke Isidu (fashion designer)
Sachio Ito (novelist)
Kaiji Kawaguchi (manga artist)
Yuzo Kawashima (film director)
Kan Kikuchi (novelist)
Keiko Kitagawa (actress)
Yuki Kobayashi (professional soccer player)
Ryuki Miura (professional soccer player)
Mayumi Mizuno (announcer)
Masaru Kitano (doctor of engineering and TV commentator)
Takeshi Kitano (film director)
Daichi Kiyono (actor, rugby player)
Akira Kobayashi (film actor)
Yasuo Kobayashi (aikido instructor)
Masao Koga (composer)
Masato Koizumi (Preacher)
Shigeaki Kosugi (freelance broadcaster/actor)
Keiichiro Koyama (actor, singer (J-pop group NEWS), former MC (Shounen Club)
Kazufumi Miyazawa (composer, singer)
Showtaro Morikubo (voice actor, actor, singer)
Osamu Mukai (actor)
Yuto Nagatomo (professional soccer player)
Toshiyuki Nishida (film actor)
Hiroshi Ohshita (Professional Baseball Player, Hall of famer)
Yoshiaki Oiwa (Equestrian Eventing Rider)
Kihachi Okamoto (film director)
Ren Osugi (film actor)
Toshio Sakai (photographer)
Motoi Sakuraba (composer, musician)
Kazuhiro Sano (film director and actor)
Kiyoshi Sasabe (film director)
Mamoru Sasaki (screenwriter)
Norio Sasaki (soccer manager)
Kentaro Seki (professional soccer player)
Fusako Shigenobu (activist)
Tetsuo Shinohara (film director)
Sohn Kee-chung (marathon runner)
Kokichi Sugihara (mathematician and artist)
Denmei Suzuki (film actor)
Shigeyoshi Suzuki (film director)
Yuzo Takada (manga artist)
Ken Takakura (film actor)
Buyūzan Takeyoshi (sumo wrestler)
Noboru Tanaka (film director)
Kenichiro Teratsuji (KENCHI) (dancer and actor) 
Eijirō Tōno (film actor)
Keigo Tsunemoto (professional soccer player)
Ryoichi Uchimura (Keishicho, Kendo player, 2-time All Japan winner)
Naomi Uemura (mountain climber, adventurer)
Moriteru Ueshiba (Third Aikido Doshu)
Koji Yamamoto (basketball player)
Mizuki Yamamoto (model, actress)
Tatsuro Yamashita (composer, singer)
Tomohisa Yamashita (actor, singer)
Yoshihiro Yonezawa
Tom Yoda (Business Administration Graduate), current councilor of the university and ex-chairman of Avex Group
Kenjirou Tsuda (actor, voice actor)
 Shingo Fujimori (Oriental Radio/Comedian)
 Chicara Jericho (voice actress)
Shogo Hama  (actor)

Sister Universities
 Taiwan
National Formosa University

References

External links 

Meiji University website

Meiji University
Private universities and colleges in Japan
Universities and colleges in Kanagawa Prefecture
Kawasaki, Kanagawa
American football in Japan
Kantoh Collegiate American Football Association Top 8 university
1881 establishments in Japan
Educational institutions established in 1881
Universities and colleges in Tokyo